Chabab Riadhi Témouchent, known as CR Témouchent or simply CRT for short, is an Algerian football club based in Aïn Témouchent. The club was founded in 1961 and its colours are red and white. Their home stadium, Omar Oucief Stadium, has a capacity of 11,500 spectators. The club is currently playing in the Algerian Ligue 2.

History
On May 17, 1961, a group made up of Mohradj Hadj Belghaba, Mohamed Attou, Bénamar Hadj Gourine, Zénagui Hadj Yekhled, Boumediène "Diden" Bouri, Saïd Tagri, Salem Yahiaoui, Ahmed Lalaoui, Ahmed Mahdaoui, Sid Ahmed Abden founded the club in an Aïn Témouchent cafe owned by former boxer and North African champion Ahmed Hadjouti. The first president of Chabab Riadhi Témouchent was Mohamed "Houmani" Hadjeri. After the independence of Algeria, Mankour Hadj Bensahih, known as Petit Mankour, took over as the president of the club.

On August 5, 2020, CR Témouchent promoted to the Algerian Ligue 2.

References

External links

Football clubs in Algeria
Association football clubs established in 1961
Aïn Témouchent Province
Algerian Ligue 2 clubs
1961 establishments in Algeria
Sports clubs in Algeria